Ego Ferguson (born September 22, 1991) is a former American football defensive tackle. He was drafted by the Chicago Bears in the second round of the 2014 NFL Draft. He played college football at LSU. He was also a member of the Green Bay Packers and Detroit Lions, but only appeared briefly on both teams' practice squads.

High school career 
A native of Miami, Florida, but raised in Mims, Ferguson originally attended Saint John's Catholic Prep in Frederick, Maryland, before transferring to Hargrave Military Academy in Chatham, Virginia, for his senior year of high school. Regarded as a four-star recruit by Rivals.com, Ferguson was ranked as the sixth best strong-side defensive end prospect in the class of 2010, behind top-ranked prospect Jackson Jeffcoat and third-ranked prospect William Gholston.  Ferguson was ranked seventh-best defensive end prospect in the country by Scout.com. After official visits to LSU, Notre Dame, California, Florida State, and Miami, Ferguson committed to the LSU Tigers to play college football under head coach Les Miles.

College career 
At LSU, Ferguson was redshirted as a true freshman. After two years as a backup, Ferguson replaced Bennie Logan at the right defensive tackle position. Ferguson announced on January 3, 2014 that he would forgo his senior season and enter the 2014 NFL Draft. Ferguson earned honorable mention All-SEC honors as a junior in 2013.

Professional career

Chicago Bears
On May 9, 2014, Ferguson was drafted in the second round by the Chicago Bears with the 51st overall pick of the 2014 NFL Draft. He signed a four-year contract on May 13, 2014.  Ferguson made his NFL debut on September 7, 2014, versus the Buffalo Bills. In 2015, Ferguson appeared in four games before being placed on injured reserve with a knee injury. On November 12, 2015, Ferguson was hit by the NFL with a four-game suspension for violating the league's policy for performance-enhancing drugs. Ferguson was waived/injured and placed on injured reserve before the start of the 2016 NFL season after sustaining a shoulder injury in the Bears' preseason finale that required season-ending surgery.

On March 31, 2017, Ferguson was released by the Bears.

Green Bay Packers
On April 3, 2017, Ferguson was claimed off waivers by the Green Bay Packers. He was waived by the Packers two days later after a failed physical.

Detroit Lions
On June 8, 2017, Ferguson signed with the Detroit Lions. On September 2, 2017, he was waived by the Lions.

Season statistics

References

External links 
LSU Tigers bio

1991 births
Living people
People from Mims, Florida
American football defensive tackles
LSU Tigers football players
Chicago Bears players
Green Bay Packers players
Detroit Lions players
Saint John's Catholic Prep (Maryland) alumni